Christine Majerus (born 25 February 1987) is a Luxembourgish professional road and cyclo-cross cyclist, who currently rides for UCI Women's WorldTeam . She won the 2013 Sparkassen Giro Bochum one-day road race and the general classification of the 2019 Holland Ladies Tour.

Majerus is one of the most dominant cyclists to come out of Luxembourg and is a 41-time national champion, holding 16 time trial titles, 12 cyclo-cross titles and 13 road race titles. She was named Luxembourgish Sportswoman of the Year in 2013 and in every ceremony from 2015 to 2021.

Career
Majerus began her sporting career in athletics and was the Luxembourg champion at the 400 and 800 metres several times before switching to cycling following a foot injury.

She often acts as road captain and has frequently been referred to as a super-domestique, but has also placed as high as ninth on the UCI Women's Road World Rankings (in 2019).

Majerus is also a member of the Elite Sports Section of the Luxembourg Army. She completed her basic training in 2012 and is not required to perform active service during her subsequent professional cycling career.

Olympics
Majerus competed at the 2012 Summer Olympics in the Women's road race, finishing 21st. She went on to compete in the 2016 and 2020 Games, and carried the flag for Luxembourg at the opening ceremony of the 2020 Olympics in Tokyo.

Major results

Cyclo-cross

2006–2007
 3rd National Championships
2007–2008
 3rd National Championships
2008–2009
 2nd National Championships
2009–2010
 1st  National Championships
2010–2011
 1st  National Championships
2011–2012
 1st  National Championships
2012–2013
 1st  National Championships
2013–2014
 1st  National Championships
2014–2015
 1st  National Championships
 National Trophy Series
2nd Milton Keynes
2015–2016
 1st  National Championships
 2nd Otegem
 2nd Pétange
 3rd Bensheim
2016–2017
 1st  National Championships
 EKZ CrossTour
1st Meilen
2nd Baden
 1st Otegem
 1st Pétange
 1st Leudelange
 2nd Zonnebeke
 Superprestige
3rd Gavere
3rd Spa-Francorchamps
2017–2018
 1st  National Championships
 Coupe de France
1st Jablines
1st Flamanville
 1st Pétange
 EKZ CrossTour
2nd Meilen
 2nd Otegem
 2nd Contern
 3rd Rucphen
2018–2019
 1st  National Championships
 1st Pétange
 1st La Meziere
 EKZ CrossTour
2nd Meilen
2nd Eschenbach
3rd Hittnau
 3rd Zonnebeke
2019–2020
 1st  National Championships
 EKZ CrossTour
1st Hittnau
1st Meilen
 1st Zonnebeke
 2nd Troyes
2020–2021
 EKZ CrossTour
1st Hittnau
2021–2022
 1st  National Championships
 1st Pétange

Mountain Bike

 1st  Cross-country, Games of the Small States of Europe

Road
Source: 

2007
 National Championships
1st  Time trial
3rd Road race
2008
 National Championships
1st  Time trial
2nd Road race
 1st GP de la Ville de L'Hôpital
 4th Grand Prix Elsy Jacobs
 4th Trophée des Grimpeurs
2009
 National Championships
1st  Time trial
2nd Road race
 2nd Wielertrofee Vlaanderen
 3rd Cholet Pays de Loire
 10th Chrono des Nations
2010
 National Championships
1st  Time trial
1st  Road race
 2nd Cholet Pays de Loire
 2nd Beine-Nauroy
 3rd Ladies Berry Classics Cher
 5th GP Stad Roeselare
2011
 1st  Road race, Games of the Small States of Europe
 National Championships
1st  Time trial
1st  Road race
 1st Retonfrey Critérium
 1st Thermse Kasseienomloop
 2nd Sparkassen Giro
 2nd Erondegemse Pijl
 5th Cholet Pays de Loire
 7th Gooik–Geraardsbergen–Gooik
 8th Halle-Buizingen
 9th Grand Prix de Dottignies
 9th GP Stad Roeselare
2012
 National Championships
1st  Time trial
1st  Road race
 2nd Overall Nogent l'Abbesse et Beine-Nauroy
1st Stage 1
 4th Grand Prix de Dottignies
 5th Overall Tour de Bretagne
 5th Cholet Pays de Loire
 7th Halle-Buizingen
 8th Le Samyn
 8th Tour of Flanders
2013
 Games of the Small States of Europe
1st  Road race
1st  Time trial
 National Championships
1st  Time trial
1st  Road race
 1st Sparkassen Giro Bochum
 1st  Mountains classification, Thüringen Rundfahrt
 3rd Erondegemse Pijl
 6th Classica Citta di Padova
 8th Omloop van het Hageland
 9th Overall Grand Prix Elsy Jacobs
 9th Gooik–Geraardsbergen–Gooik
2014
 National Championships
1st  Time trial
1st  Road race
 3rd Open de Suède Vårgårda TTT
 4th Overall Thüringen Rundfahrt
 6th Sparkassen Giro
 9th Gooik–Geraardsbergen–Gooik
 10th Omloop Het Nieuwsblad
2015
 National Championships
1st  Time trial
1st  Road race
 2nd  Team time trial, UCI World Championships
 2nd Overall Tour de Bretagne
1st Points classification
 3rd Overall Energiewacht Tour
 3rd Overall The Women's Tour
1st Stage 3
 3rd Novilon EDR Cup
 3rd Grand Prix cycliste de Gatineau
 3rd Crescent Women World Cup Vårgårda TTT
 4th Diamond Tour
 6th Overall Festival Luxembourgeois du Elsy Jacobs
 6th Overall Tour of Norway
 6th Sparkassen Giro
 8th Omloop Het Nieuwsblad
 8th Dwars door de Westhoek
 10th La Course by Le Tour de France
2016
 1st  Team time trial, UCI World Championships
 National Championships
1st  Time trial
1st  Road race
 1st Dwars door de Westhoek
 1st La Classique Morbihan
 1st Stage 1 (TTT) Energiewacht Tour
 1st Stage 1 The Women's Tour
 1st Stage 2 (TTT) Holland Ladies Tour
 2nd Drentse Acht van Westerveld
 2nd Grand Prix de Plumelec-Morbihan
 2nd Diamond Tour
 3rd Omloop van Borsele
 7th Overall Festival Luxembourgeois du Elsy Jacobs
 7th Le Samyn
 9th Giro dell'Emilia
2017
 National Championships
1st  Time trial
1st  Road race
 1st  Overall Grand Prix Elsy Jacobs
1st  Points classification
1st Stage 1
 Crescent Vårgårda
1st Team time trial
4th Road race
 UCI World Championships
2nd  Team time trial
6th Road race
 2nd Overall The Women's Tour
1st  Points classification
1st  Sprints classification
 5th Overall Healthy Ageing Tour
1st Stage 2 (TTT)
 7th Overall Tour of Norway
2018
 National Championships
1st  Time trial
1st  Road race
 Crescent Vårgårda
1st Team time trial
6th Road race
 2nd  Team time trial, UCI World Championships
 2nd Overall Festival Elsy Jacobs
1st Stage 1
 3rd Overall Healthy Ageing Tour
1st Stage 1b (TTT)
 3rd Three Days of Bruges–De Panne
 4th Overall The Women's Tour
 4th Overall Tour of Norway
2019
 National Championships
1st  Time trial
1st  Road race
 1st  Overall Holland Ladies Tour
 1st La Classique Morbihan
 1st Grand Prix International d'Isbergues
 4th Overall Tour de Yorkshire
1st  Points classification
 4th Overall The Women's Tour
 4th Overall Madrid Challenge by la Vuelta
 7th RideLondon Classique
 8th Overall Healthy Ageing Tour
 8th Overall Tour of Norway
 9th Road race, UEC European Championships
 9th Overall Grand Prix Elsy Jacobs
 9th Overall BeNe Ladies Tour
2020
 National Championships
1st  Time trial
1st  Road race
 2nd Le Samyn
 5th Clasica Femenina Navarra
2021
 National Championships
1st  Time trial
1st  Road race
 2nd Dwars door het Hageland
 8th Overall Festival Elsy Jacobs
 8th Overall Thüringen Ladies Tour
 9th Drentse Acht van Westerveld
 10th Nokere Koerse
2022
 National Championships
1st  Time trial
1st  Road race
 1st Drentse Acht van Westerveld
 2nd Postnord Vårgårda WestSweden TTT

References

External links
 
 
 
 
 
 
 
 

1987 births
Living people
Luxembourgian female cyclists
Olympic cyclists of Luxembourg
Cyclists at the 2012 Summer Olympics
Cyclists at the 2016 Summer Olympics
Cyclists at the 2020 Summer Olympics
Sportspeople from Luxembourg City
European Games competitors for Luxembourg
Cyclists at the 2019 European Games
Cyclo-cross cyclists